The 5th The Beatz Awards, was held at Muson Center in Lagos on 24 November 2019. Nominees were revealed on October 15, 2019. The live show was televised on STV, Nigezie TV, wapTV, TVC, BEN Television, and MTV Base, and hosted by Dr SID. It celebrated entertainment personalities across 25 voting categories, with 4 honorary Awards (non-voting). Kel-P had the highest award winnings at The Beatz Awards, by securing 3 awards at the ceremony.

At the ceremony, Don Jazzy was honored with the Lifetime Achievement Award, and the "New Discovery Producer" category was renamed "Don Jazzy New Discovery Producer". While receiving the award, he added a 1 million cash prize to the winner from the 6th edition of the award.

Performers

Presenters
 Dr SID

Nominations and winners
The following is a list of nominees and the winners  are listed highlighted in boldface.

Special recognition awards

References 

2019 music awards
2019 awards